Expo Centre Lahore is a  convention center located in Lahore, Punjab, Pakistan. Designed by joint venture of National Engineering Services Pakistan (NESPAK) and Nayyar Ali Dada & Associates, the convention center is located in Johar Town at the corner of Abdul Haque Road and Shahrah Nazaria-e-Pakistan. Construction began in 2007 and was completed in 2010.

History
A Memorandum of Understanding (MoU) was signed by the Government of Punjab, Pakistan and the federal government on 30 March 2002 for this purpose. The centre was established jointly by the provincial and federal governments of Pakistan at a 400-kanal land plot provided by the Lahore Development Authority on a 40-years lease in 2004. The intent was to provide local exporters a central location for displaying their products and providing product information to foreign trade delegations and buyers under one roof.

Venues
The expo centre is divided into several sections:
Exhibition Halls
Hall 01
Hall 02
Hall 03
Convention Hall
Auditorium 01
Auditorium 02
Foyer
Summit Room
Meeting Rooms
General Hall
Hall A
Hall B
Open Event Area

Pakistan leather show
In 2017, 'The 3rd Pakistan Mega Leather Show 2017' was held at this Expo Centre. This show was targeted at giving a boost to the Pakistani leather industry and provided buyers and sellers an environment to explore business opportunities. Trade Development Authority of Pakistan (TDAP) Chief Executive S. M. Munir addressed the opening ceremony of the show and stated, "Pakistani exporters have great potential and capability to compete in the international markets."

Lahore international book fair
In February 2019, 'The 33rd Lahore International Book Fair' was held at the Expo Centre with 270 stalls showcasing books on medical, poetry, engineering, science, art, culture, novels, biographies, travelogues, textbooks, history, social sciences, geography, religion and many other topics.

Temporary use in emergency
In 2020, during the COVID-19 pandemic crisis, a temporary field hospital was set up at this Expo Centre to deal with the emergency overflow of patients that could not be accommodated at the many hospitals in and around the city of Lahore.

See also 
 Karachi Expo Centre
 Hyderabad Expo Center

References

External links 
 Expo Centre Lahore official website

2007 establishments in Pakistan
Buildings and structures in Lahore
Buildings and structures completed in 2010
Convention centres in Pakistan
Event venues established in 2007
Music venues in Pakistan